Today's the Day was a British television daytime quiz programme that was broadcast on BBC2 from 12 July 1993 until 12 March 1999. The programme was originally hosted by Andrew Rawnsley until he was replaced by Martyn Lewis.

Format
Teams of two contestants each competed to answer questions about events that had taken place in past years on the episode's broadcast date.

Several rounds were played during each episode, with the order varying slightly from one series to the next:

 Stop the Clip: A 30-second news film clip was played, and the first contestant to buzz in with a correct answer to the host's question about it won points for his/her team. The point value decreased as the clip continued.
 TV Round: Teams alternated choosing clips from classic television shows on a video wall and answering questions about them. A miss gave the opposing team a chance to score with a correct answer.
 Quick-Fire Round: A speed round of questions, in which anyone from either team could buzz in.
 Video Wall: Same rules as the TV Round, but using news film clips.
 One-Minute Quick-Fire Round: Always played as the final round to determine the day's winner. One contestant from each team took part; playing separately, each was given 60 seconds to answer as many questions as possible. The contestant on the trailing team went first.

Teams could remain on the show for a maximum of five days before retiring undefeated. At the end of each series, the teams with the highest final scores were invited back to compete in a knockout tournament, with a pair of round-the-world air tickets awarded to the winning team. All contestants who appeared on the programme received a newspaper printed on the day they were born.

Transmissions

Regular

Champions League

Specials

References

External links

1990s British game shows
1993 British television series debuts
1999 British television series endings
BBC television game shows
Quiz shows
English-language television shows